The International Television & Video Almanac is an annual almanac of the television and video industry that has been published under various titles since 1929.

History
The almanac was first published as The Motion Picture Almanac in 1929, edited and compiled by the staff of Martin Quigley's motion picture trade journal, Exhibitors Herald-World.  It became the International Motion Picture Almanac in 1936, then the Motion Picture and Television Almanac and subsequently the International Television Almanac. It has been published by the Quigley Publishing Company since inception.

References

External links 

The Motion Picture Almanac, 1929.
International Motion Picture Almanac, 1937-38.

Annual publications
Television industry
Film industry
Almanacs
Publications established in 1929